Aloha (not ) is a census-designated place and unincorporated community in Washington County, Oregon, United States. As of the 2020 Census, the population was 53,828. Fire protection and EMS services are provided through Tualatin Valley Fire and Rescue. and Metro West Ambulance.

History
On January 9, 1912, the community received its name with the opening of a post office named Aloha; the area had previously been known as Wheeler Crossing. According to Oregon Geographic Names, the origin of the name Aloha is disputed. Some sources say it was named by Robert Caples, a railroad worker, but it is unknown why the name was chosen. In 1983 Joseph H. Buck claimed that his uncle, the first postmaster, Julius Buck, named the office "Aloah" after a small resort on Lake Winnebago in Wisconsin. Supposedly the last two letters were transposed by the Post Office during the application process.

The community attempted to incorporate in 1984, but the regional boundary commission halted the effort after determining the community could not provide the needed municipal services of a city.

In 2012, a public library was opened in a space within a strip mall shopping center on Farmington Road at Kinnaman Road (previously anchored by Bales Thriftway until its closure in 2020).  Named the Aloha Community Library, it was established by the non-profit Aloha Community Library Association and is staffed by volunteers. At the time of its opening, it had about 4,500 books.

Geography

Demographics

As of the census of 2000, there were 41,741 people, 14,228 households, and 10,841 families residing in the community. The population density was 5,660.5 people per square mile (2,186.7/km2). There were 14,851 housing units at an average density of 2,013.9 per square mile (778.0/km2). The racial makeup of the CDP was 79.40% White, 1.35% African American, 0.78% Native American, 7.69% Asian, 0.37% Pacific Islander, 6.70% from other races, and 3.72% from two or more races. Hispanic or Latino of any race were 12.93% of the population.
There were 14,228 households, out of which 42.9% had children under the age of 18 living with them, 59.4% were married couples living together, 11.6% had a female householder with no husband present, and 23.8% were non-families. 16.9% of all households were made up of individuals, and 3.5% had someone living alone who was 65 years of age or older. The average household size was 2.92 and the average family size was 3.28.

In the community, the population was spread out, with 29.8% under the age of 18, 9.1% from 18 to 24, 35.0% from 25 to 44, 20.3% from 45 to 64, and 5.7% who were 65 years of age or older. The median age was 31 years. For every 100 females, there were 101.5 males. For every 100 females age 18 and over, there were 99.8 males.

The median income for a household in the community was $52,299, and the median income for a family was $56,566. Males had a median income of $40,369 versus $29,921 for females. The per capita income for the community was $19,685. About 5.6% of families and 7.9% of the population were below the poverty line, including 9.4% of those under age 18 and 5.2% of those age 65 or over.

Education

Aloha is served by the Beaverton and Hillsboro school districts.

Beaverton schools in the area include Aloha High School and the International School of Beaverton.  Aloha is served by Mountain View and Five Oaks middle schools and Aloha-Huber Park, Beaver Acres, Cooper Mountain, Errol Hassell, Hazeldale, and Kinnaman elementary schools.

Hillsboro schools serving Aloha include Century High School, R. A. Brown middle school, and Butternut Creek, Imlay, Indian Hills, Reedville, and Tobias elementary schools.

Private schools in or near Aloha include Life Christian School, Palace of Praise Academy, and the elementary campus of Faith Bible Christian School.

Notable people

Jeff Barker, Oregon State Representative
Damien Echols, member of the West Memphis Three
Jensen Huang, Founder and CEO of Nvidia
Loren Parks, Businessman, founder of Parks Medical Electronics, and political donor

See also
M. E. Blanton House

References

External links

Harvey the Giant Rabbit

Census-designated places in Oregon
Portland metropolitan area
Unincorporated communities in Washington County, Oregon
1912 establishments in Oregon
Census-designated places in Washington County, Oregon
Unincorporated communities in Oregon
Populated places established in 1912